This is a list collecting the most notable films produced in Hungary and in the Hungarian language.

The list is divided into three major political-historical eras.

For an alphabetical list of articles on Hungarian films see :Category:Hungarian films.

1901-1947

This list includes notable Hungarian films produced during the periods of the Austro-Hungarian Monarchy, the Kingdom of Hungary, and the Second Hungarian Republic.

1948-1989

This list includes notable Hungarian films produced during the Communist period of Hungary, under the People's Republic of Hungary.

Since 1990

This list includes notable Hungarian films produced after the change of regime in 1989.

External links
 Hungarian film at the Internet Movie Database